Anita Francis Lerman (born July 16, 1944, in Brooklyn) is an American politician and member of the Independence Party of New York. She ran for Congress in New York City in 2006.

Personal
Anita Lerman married in 1989, shortly after receiving her Ph.D., to Thomas Wm. Hamilton 4897 Tomhamilton.
Lerman was educated at Brooklyn College, Long Island University, and Hofstra University, obtaining the degrees of BA from Brooklyn, MA from Long Island University, and a PhD in psychology (1989) from Hofstra. She was employed as a staff psychologist with the New York City Board of Education.  She retired from this position in 2011 following being diagnosed with colon cancer.

Political activity
Her political activities began in 1983 following the U.S. Navy announcing plans to build a base for a Surface Action Group on Staten Island, and it was in this activity she met the chair of the Staten Island organization opposing the base, whom she later married.  Lerman and her husband joined the Independence Party immediately after it gained ballot status in 1994, becoming a member of the State Committee and Treasurer (later Vice Chair) of the Staten Island branch of the party.

She was the party candidate in several elections. In many of the early elections involving the Independence Party Lerman battled with the Board of Elections to gain ballot status for party candidates on Staten Island, with the Board consistently claiming Lerman's petitions failed to abide by various rules.  Lerman generally succeeded in getting her candidates on the ballot by going to court. Finally, in 1999 the Richmond County Independence Party tried to cross-endorse a Democrat, John Sollazo for an office.  The Board rejected Lerman's petitions on the grounds she did not live in the district in which Sollazo was running.  She took the case to federal court pro se, and Judge Eugene Nickerson ruled the requirement that the petitioner live in the district was irrational.  The Board of Elections appealed all the way to the United States Supreme Court. At this point the Brennan Center for Justice, a division of the School of Law of New York University, stepped in and became Lerman's legal representative. The Supreme Court ultimately upheld Nickerson's ruling, forcing a change of law not just in New York State, but in eighteen other states as well.  Lerman received an Anti-Corruption Award from the statewide Independence Party for this accomplishment.
 
For her 2006 campaign for Congress in the New York's 13th congressional district, Anita Lerman identified the following issues for her platform. Firstly the equipping of individual households with solar and wind generated electricity. Secondly she argued for the lowering of the cost of gasoline in the United States.

References

http://www.worldcat.org/title/association-of-femininity-assertiveness-and-socioeconomic-status-with-marital-adjustment

1944 births
Living people
Politicians from Brooklyn
Brooklyn College alumni
Long Island University alumni
Hofstra University alumni